Abbas Al-Qaisoum (born 31 October 1980 in Qatif, Saudi Arabia) is a Saudi Arabian weightlifter. He competed for Saudi Arabia at the 2012 Summer Olympics where he placed 15th in the 94 kg group B.

References

1980 births
Living people
Saudi Arabian male weightlifters
Weightlifters at the 2012 Summer Olympics
Olympic weightlifters of Saudi Arabia
Weightlifters at the 2006 Asian Games
Weightlifters at the 2010 Asian Games
Weightlifters at the 2014 Asian Games
Asian Games competitors for Saudi Arabia
People from Qatif
21st-century Saudi Arabian people